The Rapid Operational Response Unit, commonly abbreviated KORD (Ukrainian: КОРД), is a special purpose unit of the National Police of Ukraine. It is designed to respond to emergency situations, the level of which is so high and complex that it may exceed the capabilities of other rapid reaction forces or operational search units.

History
KORD was created as a special police force for the then-recently created National Police of Ukraine. Recruitment and training started in 2015 and in 2016 the first units were formed. KORD received training from special police units from the United States, specially from the DEA and US Marshals. The force was also present at the Anti-Terrorist Operation in Eastern Ukraine.

KORD has been involved in fighting in the 2022 Russian invasion of Ukraine, where the Kyiv KORD units ambushed Russian tanks and BMPs at the Kyiv offensive and at Brovary. For their actions, the KORD operators were awarded military awards by President of Ukraine Volodymyr Zelenskyy.

Missions

Among the main missions of KORD are:

 Developing, preparing, and conducting special operations to capture dangerous criminals
 Suppressing crimes committed by members of criminal groups
 Rescuing hostages
 Providing force support in the conduct of operative-search actions
 Providing support to other police units to ensure superior firepower over offenders
 Taking part in anti-terrorist operations conducted by the Anti-terrorist Centre of the Security Service of Ukraine
 Studying and summarizing domestic and foreign experience, as well as the methods of work of similar foreign units in this area
 Ensuring the implementation of security measures for persons involved in criminal proceedings

Gallery

In popular culture 

 KORD is featured in the opening scene of Tenet (2020), attempting to stop a terrorist attack at the Kyiv opera.

References

External links

 Official website of National Police

Ministry of Internal Affairs (Ukraine)
Non-military counterterrorist organizations
2016 establishments in Ukraine